The Malankara Orthodox Diocese of Southwest America, sometimes referred to as the Southwest Diocese or DS-WA is a diocese of the Malankara Orthodox Syrian Church. The diocesan headquarters are located in Beasley, Texas a suburban city in Texas 40 miles from downtown Houston. The southwest diocese covers several churches in the U.S. states, and Canada.

History

American diocese 
The American diocese was established in 1979 by Thomas Makarios. In 1991, after the death of Makarios, Mathews Barnabas was enthroned as metropolitan in 1993. In 2002, Zachariah Nicholovos was appointed as the assistant metropolitan.

Formation of the Southwest Diocese 
The Diocese was formed by order number 145/2009 signed by the Catholicos of  the Apostolic Throne of St. Thomas and Malankara Metropolitan, Didymus I on 1 April 2009. Barnabas and Nicholovos were appointed to the Northeast American Diocese and Alexios Eusebius was appointed the Southwest Diocese.

According to order number 01/2017, Eusebius was transferred to the Diocese of Mavelikkara. Subsequently the Malankara Metropolitan assumed control over the diocese and Zacharias Aprem was appointed as the assistant metropolitan to the diocese. In October 2022, Thomas Ivanios was appointed as the permanent Diocesan Metropolitan bringing an end to the temporary administrative set up that lasted for over five years.

Today 
As of April 2020, there are 63 churches in the southwest diocese.

Diocesan metropolitan 
Assistant metropolitan

References

Further reading 
Shehimo: Book of Common Prayer. (n.d.). (n.p.): Liturgical Resource Development.

Konat, J. A. (n.d.). Service Book of the Holy Qurbono: English with Commentary & Malayalam with Transliteration. (n.p.): Malankara Orthodox Church Publications.

Y. M. A., Irenaios, Y. M. (2017). A Study of the Experience of the Unspeakable and Its Manifestations in Selected Mystic Saints and Holy Persons in the Malankara Orthodox Syrian Church. India: SFS Publications.

The Book of Common Prayer of the Syrian Church. (2005). United States: Gorgias Press.

Krikorian, M. K. (2010). Christology of the Oriental Orthodox Churches: Christology in the Tradition of the Armenian Apostolic Church. Austria: Peter Lang.

External links

 Diocese of South-West America
Malankara Orthodox Syrian Church

Malankara Orthodox Syrian Church dioceses
Oriental Orthodox dioceses in the United States
Oriental Orthodoxy in Canada
2009 establishments in North America